Pagach or Pa Gach may refer to:

Places 
 Pagach, Chaharmahal and Bakhtiari
 Pagach, Khuzestan
 Pa Gach-e Lahbari, Khuzestan Province
 Pa Gach-e Kal Jamshid, Kohgiluyeh and Boyer-Ahmad Province

Other users 
 Pagach (food), a Lenten dish

See also
 Pagachi (disambiguation)